Tanauan Airfield is a World War II airfield located near Tanauan in the province of Leyte, Philippines. It was closed after the war.

History
The airfield was built by the Americans shortly after landing on Leyte in November 1944. It was used by the 312th Bombardment Group (19 November 1944 - 10 February 1945) and 433d Troop Carrier Group (19 January - 31 May 1945).

With the withdrawal of American forces, the airfield was abandoned. There is little or no trace of its existence.

See also

 USAAF in the Southwest Pacific

References

 Maurer, Maurer (1983). Air Force Combat Units Of World War II. Maxwell AFB, Alabama: Office of Air Force History. .
 www.pacificwrecks.com

External links

Airfields of the United States Army Air Forces in the Philippines
Military history of the Philippines during World War II
Buildings and structures in Leyte (province)
History of Leyte (province)
Airports established in 1944